Hydrogen tube trailers are semi-trailers that consist of 4 to 36 cluster high-pressure hydrogen tanks varying in length from  for small tubes to  on jumbo tube trailers. They are part of the hydrogen highway and usually precede a local hydrogen station.

Types

Modular tube trailer
Modular tube trailers range from 8 to 54 tubes.

Intermediate trailer

Jumbo tube trailer 

Composite tube trailers
As of 2012, the US Department of Transportation (DOT) started to award Special Permits (SP) to different manufactures to produce Type IV Hydrogen trailers in the US. The US is the current leader in Composite tank manufacturing.

See also
Hydrogen economy
 Hydrogen infrastructure
 Liquid hydrogen tank car
 Liquid hydrogen tanktainer
 Liquid hydrogen trailer

References

External links
2006 - Hydrogen Delivery and On-Board Storage Analysis Workshop
Hydrogen Transport by Tube Trailer
Jumbo tube trailer tables

Hydrogen infrastructure
Hydrogen storage
Trailers
Industrial gases